.gi is the country code top-level domain (ccTLD) for Gibraltar, a British Overseas Territory.

Second-level domain names
 .com.gi (commercial organisations)
 .ltd.gi (registered public or private limited companies)
 .gov.gi (Gibraltar government departments, bodies, and associated government-funded organisations)
 .mod.gi (Gibraltar Ministry of Defence departments)
 .edu.gi (schools and Education departments)
 .org.gi (non-commercial organisations)

Use in Girona
It has been used for some official domains for the Spanish city of Girona due to its coincidence in abbreviation. This limited use began prior to the creation of the .cat TLD because of Catalan reluctance to use domains under the Spanish country code TLD .es. Subsequent rules changes prevent new 2nd level registrations directly under .gi for entities not connected with Gibraltar.

References

External links
Gibraltar NIC
IANA .gi whois information
ajuntament.gi: City of Girona 

Country code top-level domains
Communications in Gibraltar
Council of European National Top Level Domain Registries members

sv:Toppdomän#G